Nucleus Software Exports Limited (NSE: NUCLEUS) is an Indian IT company in the Banking and Financial Services sector. It offers IT and consultancy services serving a variety of sectors of the banking industry. It is listed on the Bombay Stock Exchange and the National Stock Exchange of India.

The company has its headquarters in Noida, Uttar Pradesh, India, and it operates in more than 50 countries.

History
Nucleus Software started its operations in 1986 in a small office at Thyagraj Nagar, New Delhi. In 1994, the company went global with its entry into Singapore. In 1995, it became a public company, when it issued 201,000 equity shares of Rs 10 each. In 2005–06, Nucleus Software expanded its operations in Europe with wholly owned subsidiary in Amsterdam. The company was awarded with Gold shield for Excellence in Financial Reporting 2010 by Institute of Chartered Accountants of India (ICAI).

Operations
Nucleus Software Exports Limited operates in more than 50 countries and has its headquarters in Noida, Uttar Pradesh, India. As of 31 March 2014, Nucleus Software had 14 offices across 10 countries and seven wholly owned subsidiarie:
 Nucleus Software Solutions Pte. Ltd., Singapore
 Nucleus Software Inc., US
 Nucleus Software Japan Kabushiki Kaisha, Japan
 VirStra i-Technology Services Ltd., India
 Nucleus Software Netherlands B.V., Netherlands
 Nucleus Software Ltd., India
 Nucleus Software Australia Pty. Ltd., Australia

See also
 List of Indian IT companies

References

External links
 

Financial technology companies
Companies based in Noida
1986 establishments in Uttar Pradesh
Software companies of India
Software companies established in 1986
Companies listed on the National Stock Exchange of India
Companies listed on the Bombay Stock Exchange